Wangjiawan Station is a transfer station on Line 3 and Line 4 of the Wuhan Metro. It entered revenue service on December 28, 2014. It is in Hanyang District.

Station layout

Gallery

Station

Extrance

References

Wuhan Metro stations
Line 3, Wuhan Metro
Line 4, Wuhan Metro
Railway stations in China opened in 2014